Olavu Geluvu is a 1977 Indian Kannada-language film, directed by H. R. Bhargava and produced by S. A. Srinivas. The film stars Rajkumar, Lakshmi, Balakrishna and Sampath. The film has musical score by G. K. Venkatesh.

A famous sequence from this movie - where the hero repeatedly calls a landline number but disconnects the call giving a feel of wrong connection but finally doesn't disconnect it when both the villains are into discussion - went on to be used in the 1984 Hindi movie Duniya.

Plot 
The lead character Rajkumar plays the role of an English professor, Mohan, in this movie. The story begins with a few fun-filled incidents that happen between him and Rohini, the most popular girl in college (played by Lakshmi). As the story unfolds, the two lead characters end up falling in love. The news of their love affair reach both the families and leads to Rohini deciding to end the relationship. Rajkumar's mentally ill brother then becomes the focus for the rest of the film.

Cast

Rajkumar
Lakshmi
Balakrishna
Sampath
Thoogudeepa Srinivas
Seetharam
Satish
Ravi
Prabhakar
Shivaprakash
Bhadrachalam
Chethan Ramarao
Jr. Shetty
Jaikumar
Honnavalli Krishna
Shreemathi
Surekha
Sunanda
Bhargavi
Sridevi
Gayathri
Komala
Lavanya
Shashikala
Vijayaleela

Soundtrack

The music was composed by G. K. Venkatesh.

References

External links
 
 

1977 films
1970s Kannada-language films
Films scored by G. K. Venkatesh
Indian romantic drama films
Films with screenplays by Chi. Udayashankar
Films directed by H. R. Bhargava
1977 romantic drama films